Kotzk (Yiddish: קאצק) is a Hasidic dynasty originating from the city of Kock, Poland, where it was founded by Menachem Mendel Morgenstern (1787–1859). Kotzk is a branch of Peshischa Hasidism, as Menachem Mendel Morgenstern was the leading disciple of Simcha Bunim of Peshischa (1765–1827). Following Simcha Bunim's death he led the divided Peschischa community, which he eventually incorporated into his own Hasidic dynasty. Kotzk follows a Hasidic philopshy known for its critical and rationalistic approach to Hasidism and its intense approach to personal improvement which is based on a process of harsh constructive criticism and total transparency of self. Kotzk is closely connected to other branches of Peshischa Hasidism such as Ger and Aleksander and is currently based out of Jerusalem.

History 
Nearing the end of his life Menachem Mendel Morgenstern lived in total seclusion from his followers. After his death, he had already amassed a large following. His eldest son, Dovid Morgenstern (1809–1893) succeeded him as the Kotzker rebbe, despite minor criticism from his followers who wanted Yitzchak Meir Alter (1799–1866) to succeed him as Kotzker rebbe. It was around this time that Avrohom Bornsztain (1838–1910), a leading disciple of Menachem Mendel Morgenstern founded the Sochatchov Hasidic dynasty based in Sochaczew. This alongside the rejected leadership of Yitzchak Meir Alter led to several minor splits amongst the community. Before the Holocaust, Kotzk was of the largest Hasidic groups which number in the tens of thousands. The last Kotzker rebbe before the Holocaust, was Yitzchak Zelig Morgenstern (1866–1939), the fourth Kotzker rebbe who served as a member of the Moetzes Gedolei HaTorah. During the Holocaust a huge percentage of the community was murdered, and following the atrocities of the Holocaust, the remaining Hasidim of Kotzk immigrated to Chicago alongside the sixth and last Kotzker rebbe, David Solomon Morgenstern (1904–1962). After his death, the community split into several fractions, the largest of which was led by Mendel Meir Morgenstern (1921–2013) who was a grandson of Yitzchak Zelig Morgenstern and the founder of the Israeli branch of Kotzk based out of Bnei Brak.

Succession of Kotzk 

 Grand Rabbi Menachem Mendel Morgenstern (1787–1859), First Kotzker Rebbe. 
 Grand Rabbi Dovid Morgenstern (1809–1893), Second Kotzker Rebbe. 
 Grand Rabbi Chaim Yisrael Morgenstern (1840–1905), Third Kotzker Rebbe. 
 Grand Rabbi Yitzchak Zelig Morgenstern (1866–1940), Fourth Kotzker Rebbe.
 Grand Rabbi Jacob Mendel Morgenstern (1887–1939), Fifth Kotzker Rebbe. 
 Grand Rabbi David Solomon Morgenstern (1904–1962), Sixth Kotzker Rebbe. 
 Rabbi Moshe Dovid Morgenstern (1892–1937). 
 Grand Rabbi Mendel Meir Morgenstern (1921–2013), Kotzker Rebbe of Bnei Brak. 
 Rabbi Dovid Morgenstern
 Rabbi Yitzchak Zelig Morgenstern

References 

Hasidic dynasties of Poland
Orthodox Judaism in Poland